{{speciesbox
| name = Saint Lucia lancehead
| image = Bothrops caribbaeus.jpg
| genus = Bothrops
| species = caribbaeus
| status = EN
| status_system = IUCN3.1
| status_ref = 
| authority = (Garman, 1887)
| synonyms =
Coluber lanceolatus Lacépède, 1789 (part)
Trigonocephalus caribbaeus Garman, 1887Bothrops caribbeus – Lazell, 1964
Bothrops lanceolatus caribbaeus – Sandner-Montilla, 1990
Bothrops caribbaea – Schwartz & Henderson, 1991
}}
The Saint Lucia lancehead or Saint Lucia pit viper (Bothrops caribbaeus) is a endangered species of venomous snake endemic to the island of Saint Lucia in the Lesser Antilles..

Description
It is gray to gray-brown, with an irregular temporal stripe, and gray or brown markings that are distinct mid-dorsally and fade towards its sides.

Distribution and habitat
It is found only on Saint Lucia. Along with Bothrops lanceolatus and B. atrox, it is one of three Bothrops species found in the Caribbean. The snake is threatened and today limited to two areas of the island. The only location outside of St. Lucia where these snakes are kept is the Kentucky Reptile Zoo.

Venom 
Accidents with this pit viper are extremely rare, with only one report. The victim had local pain and edema, and after a week had developed left facial hemiplegia with facial paralysis and local bleeding, extensive swelling, edema in the abdomen and chest, necrosis and cerebral ischemia.

References

Further reading
 Garman, S. 1887. On West Indian Reptiles in the Museum of Comparative Zoölogy, at Cambridge, Mass. Proc. American Philos. Soc. Philadelphia 24: 278–286. ("Trigonocephalus caribbæus, sp n.", p. 285.)
 Breach, K. (2009). Quantifying the Interactions Between Humans and Endemic Pit vipers (Bothrops caribbaeus) in Saint Lucia (MSc thesis, Imperial College London). http://www.iccs.org.uk/wp-content/thesis/consci/2009/Breach.docx

External links
Bothrops caribbaeus at the Reptile Database

Bothrops
Snakes of the Caribbean
Reptiles of Saint Lucia
Endemic fauna of Saint Lucia
Reptiles described in 1887